Daimler India Commercial Vehicles Pvt. Ltd. is a subsidiary of the German Daimler Truck AG. This company designs, manufactures, and sells commercial vehicles that cater to the demands of Indian customers and are designed with nation's terrain in mind. These vehicles are branded as "BharatBenz", "Mercedes Benz" and "Fuso".

After starting production in June 2012, the first heavy-duty truck was launched in September 2012. The corporate office is located in Sholinganallur, Chennai, and the plant is located at Oragadam, Kanchipuram District, Tamil Nadu. Currently, the chief executive officer is Satyakam Arya.

History
Daimler AG has been active in the commercial vehicle business in India for decades. In 1954, the first truck specifically for the Indian market was a Mercedes-Benz, after Daimler-Benz granted a license for automobile production to India-based Tata Group. A year prior, Daimler-Benz acquired an equity interest in Tata. In 1970, Daimler-Benz and Tata entered into a licensing agreement, providing a framework for further activities. In addition, Daimler has licensed various products to other Indian manufacturers (e.g. Force Traveller). In 2007, Daimler introduced its heavy-duty Mercedes-Benz Actros to the Indian market, which is used primarily in mining operations.

In order to produce light, medium, and heavy-duty trucks for the Indian market, Daimler Trucks entered a joint venture with the Indian automobile group Hero. After receiving official approval from the Indian government in March 2008, Daimler Hero Motor Corporation Ltd. was established. The economic situation from late 2008 to mid-2009 necessitated re-positioning of Daimler Trucks' partnership with the Hero Group in India. As a result, Daimler AG and Hero Group announced on 15 April 2009 the dissolution of Daimler Hero Commercial Vehicles Ltd. in India. Afterwards, Daimler created a new Indian subsidiary without Hero Group's involvement, named Daimler India Commercial Vehicles Pvt. Ltd.

In 1994, Daimler entered the Indian market and set up Mercedes-Benz India  with its headquarters in Pune. Mercedes-Benz India is also a subsidiary of Daimler AG and is responsible for the manufacture of passenger cars and bus chassis, along with the sales and service network.

In Bangalore, Daimler has set up its largest research and development location outside of Germany, the Mercedes-Benz Research & Development India Pvt. Ltd. In addition to conducting simulations of mechanical structures, the center develops software and uses CAE and CAD tools to design vehicle components. 
Daimler India Commercial Vehicles Pvt. Ltd. (DICV) is a 100% subsidiary of Daimler AG, Germany. Its aim is to design, manufacture and sell medium- and heavy-duty commercial vehicles that cater to the demand of Indian terrain and customers. These vehicles are known by the brand name "BharatBenz". Three new trucks were launched on 26 September 2012. These include the 2523 R (a 25 tonne heavy-duty rigid truck), 2523 C (a 25 tonne heavy-duty tipper truck) and the 3123 R (a 31 tonne heavy-duty rigid truck).

With the launch of the first three heavy-duty models in September 2012 (2523R, 2523C & 3123C), BharatBenz began its offering of a range of trucks. Subsequently, BharatBenz launched its range of medium-duty trucks in February 2013, and its range of Made-in-India trucks for export markets under the FUSO brand in May 2013. Later that year, two more heavy-duty trucks (2528 & 3128) were also launched. In February 2014, DICV launched four new BharatBenz models (three tractor and one construction-mining).

Facilities
The headquarters of Daimler India Commercial Vehicles is based in Chennai, capital of the southern Indian state Tamil Nadu. The corporate office is situated at RMZ Millenia Business Park, Perungudi, a suburb of Chennai. While the Corporate Office performs the role of a headquarters, DICV has consolidated all functions viz., Research & Development, Human Resources, Finance & Controlling, Marketing, Sales & After sales, Product Planning, Operations and Quality Management at its new plant at Oragadam near Chennai.

The production plant at Oragadam, near Chennai, spreads over 400 acres (160 hectares) was inaugurated on 18 April 2012. The plant hosts a full production facility including body shop, paint and assembly as well as all logistics needed. Also located at Oragadam, DICV has its own 6 km test-track that simulates Indian conditions.

Before the launch of BharatBenz trucks in India in the year 2012, Daimler Trucks were available in India with the Mercedes-Benz Actros trucks which were earlier assembled at the Mercedes-Benz India plant at Chakan, Pune. The Mercedes-Benz Actros trucks are now assembled at DICV's Oragadam plant. DICV is responsible for all Marketing, Sales and After-sales of the Mercedes-Benz Trucks, in India.

Since the launch of the first BharatBenz dealership in Chennai in August 2012, BharatBenz has established a network of 75 outlets, and has plans to cover more than a 100 locations by early 2015.

Brands
Daimler unveiled a new brand of trucks – BharatBenz – for the Indian market on 17 February 2011. The brand was intended to offer a range of trucks in the 6–49 ton range, with vehicles for applications such as haulage, tippers and tractor trailers. In 2012 BharatBenz unveiled its first range of trucks to the media, potential customers and partners in a six-day event in Hyderabad. The BharatBenz range of trucks includes Light Duty Trucks (LDT) & Heavy Duty Trucks (HDT) in the 9, 12, 25, 31 and 49 tonne categories, featuring various usages and applications.  The first 3 Heavy-duty trucks (2523 R, 2523 C, & 3123 R) were launched on 26 September 2012. On 20 February 2013, DICV launched its Light/Medium-duty range of trucks. These trucks are based on the famous FUSO platforms.

The Mercedes-Benz Actros family of trucks is one of the most successful in the heavy-duty truck sector, selling over 600,000 units in more than 100 countries.

Daimler's Bus division launched its Mercedes-Benz inter-city luxury coaches in India in 2008. The initial entrance into India was achieved through DICV's sister-concern, Mercedes-Benz India Pvt. Ltd. However, with the establishment of DICV having become complete the obvious synergies in the area of Commercial Vehicles resulted in the transfer of Daimler Buses, India to DICV. The integration of Daimler Buses, India into DICV took place on 1 April 2013. In March 2014, DICV laid the foundation stone for its new bus plant at its Oragadam facility with an earmarked investment of 425 crores. The bus plant will design, develop and manufacture BharatBenz and Mercedes-Benz range of buses for the Indian market which is slated for launch in the second quarter of 2015.

As of now DICV deals with three brands of Daimler – "BharatBenz", "Mercedes Benz" and "Fuso".

References

External links
 Daimler India Commercial Vehicles Pvt. Ltd. website
 Website of BharatBenz

Truck manufacturers of India
Daimler Truck
2009 establishments in Tamil Nadu
Vehicle manufacturing companies established in 2009
Indian companies established in 2009
Manufacturing companies based in Chennai